Magica or Magicka may refer to:

 Magica (album), a 2000 album by heavy metal band Dio
 Magica (band), a Romanian power metal band
 Magica De Spell, a fictional character in the Scrooge McDuck universe
 Magicka, a 2011 action-adventure video game by  Arrowhead Game Studios and Paradox Interactive
 Magicka 2, a 2015 action-adventure video game by Pieces Interactive and Paradox Interactive

See also
 Costa Magica, a cruise ship originally operated by Costa Cruises
 Majika, a 2006 Philippine television drama fantasy series
 Nobuhle Majika (born 1991), Zimbabwean footballer
 Magico (disambiguation)